Thomas Bolt (born 1959 in Washington, D.C.) is an American poet and artist.

Life 
He attended public and private schools. He was a pre-college scholarship student at the Corcoran School of Art and received a B.A. in English (cum laude) and Art from the University of Virginia.

His paintings have been shown in group exhibitions in New York. Land (1982), a hand-printed book of his poems and etchings, is in the rare book collections of the Library of Congress and the University of Virginia.

His poems have appeared in The Paris Review, BOMB, and Southwest Review (where his long poem, "Wedgwood," won an award for the best poem the quarterly published in 1994).

He has read from his work in New York (at Mad Alex Presents, the Limbo Reading Series, the Poetry Society of America, the Alliance Stage Poets' Reading Series, and the Poetry Center of the 92nd Street Y), and in Rome (at the Villa Aurelia). He lives in New York City.

Awards
 Rome Prize for Literature of the American Academy of Arts and Letters
 Yale Younger Poets Prize
 The Peter I. B. Lavin Younger Poet Award of the American Academy of Poets 
 Ingram Merrill Fellowship
 1997 Artist's Fellowship from the New York Foundation for the Arts

Works
 Thomas Bolt, BOMB, Issue 45 Fall 1993
 At the Motel of the Villa of the Mysteries, Literary Imagination 2005 7: 258-261

Books
 
 Dark Ice, 1993–1997, a poem of 1,001 lines with notes and parodies of notes, was first published in BOMB in the fall of 1993.
 Dark Ice on Zembla hypertext and the ASCII version on NABOKV-L

Anthologies
 1971 Pontiac LeMans, The Paris Review, No. 109, Winter 1988
 Sixty Years of American Poetry (Harry N. Abrams, New York, 1996).
 "A Cluster of Sunsets," in the Autumn 1997 issue of Southwest Review
 Two Poems, The Paris Review, No. 154, Spring 2000

Interviews
 James Merrill, Thomas Bolt, BOMB Magazine, Issue 36 Summer 1991
 Brian Boyd, Thomas Bolt, BOMB Magazine, Issue 71 Spring 2000

Reviews
Publishers Weekly:Bolt handles his subject matter with admirable attention to detail and precision of language; he ranges easily from adjective-replete accounts to stark, minimalist statements

References

External links
 Author's Webpage

Living people
Poets from Washington (state)
University of Virginia alumni
1959 births
20th-century American poets